The American Telephone & Telegraph Co. Building  was a historic building located on the hill just north of downtown Davenport, Iowa, United States. It was listed on the National Register of Historic Places in 1983. The building has subsequently been torn down.

History
The American Telephone and Telegraph Company built this building in 1902. Ten years later the Iowa Telephone Company joined them in this facility. The two companies moved across Main Street not long after that and AT&T eventually bought out Iowa Telephone. The Knights of Columbus, a Catholic fraternal organization, used the building as their clubhouse for a number of years. They were replaced by a labor union who used the building for their local headquarters.

Architecture
The building was an example of the Romanesque Revival style made popular by Henry Hobson Richardson. Completed in 1902, it featured smooth brick walls, round-arched windows on the second floor and a decorative cornice in brick above. The lower level had large rectangular windows with sills and lintels of roughly-worked sandstone that contrasted with the smooth brick. The corner of the building at Sixth and Main Streets was angled and contained the main entrance into the building.

References

External links

Commercial buildings completed in 1902
Romanesque Revival architecture in Iowa
Former buildings and structures in Davenport, Iowa
Commercial buildings on the National Register of Historic Places in Iowa
Telephone exchange buildings
National Register of Historic Places in Davenport, Iowa
Telecommunications buildings on the National Register of Historic Places
AT&T buildings
Knights of Columbus buildings in the United States
Demolished buildings and structures in Iowa
1902 establishments in Iowa